Portlandia is a sculpture by Raymond Kaskey located above the entrance of the Portland Building in downtown Portland, Oregon. It is the second-largest copper repoussé statue in the United States, after the Statue of Liberty.

History
Portlandia was commissioned by the City of Portland in 1985. Sculptor Raymond Kaskey was paid $228,000 in public funds and reportedly an additional $100,000 in private donations.

Kaskey and his assistant Michael Lasell built sections of the statue in a Maryland suburb of Washington, D.C., and sent the parts to Portland by ship. It was assembled at a barge-building facility owned by Gunderson, Inc, and was installed on the Portland Building on October 6, 1985, after being floated up the Willamette River on a barge.

Description

The statue is based on the design of the Portland city seal. The statue depicts a female figure, Lady Commerce, dressed in classical clothes, holding a trident in her right hand and reaching down with her left. The statue is above street level and faces a relatively narrow, tree-lined street. 

An accompanying plaque includes the official dedication poem, also titled "Portlandia", written by Portland lawyer and poet Ronald Talney.

Copyright
Portlandia did not become an icon because Kaskey guards the rights to the image closely. He threatened with lawsuits anyone who used photos or illustrations of the sculpture for commercial purposes. 

The statue appears in the title sequence of the TV series Portlandia, the result of "lengthy" 
negotiations with Kaskey that required the statue not be used "in a disparaging way". In 2012, Laurelwood Brewing used an illustration of the statue on the label of Portlandia Pils, a beer it introduced; the brewery later found out about Kaskey's copyright and reached a cash settlement with Kaskey.

See also 

 1985 in art
 Berolina, personification of Berlin
 Hammonia, personification of Hamburg
 National personification
 Tethys (mythology)
 The Spirit of Detroit

References

External links
 History of Portlandia from the Regional Arts & Culture Council
 Poem by Ronald Talney on plaque
 Writing Portlandia: My 15 Minutes of Fame by Ronald Talney
 Video of Portlandia arriving in Portland at YouTube

1985 establishments in Oregon
1985 sculptures
Copper sculptures in Oregon
Culture of Portland, Oregon
Outdoor sculptures in Portland, Oregon
Southwest Portland, Oregon
Statues in Portland, Oregon
Sculptures of women in Oregon
Civic personifications
Architectural sculpture